Peggy Sayers (born October 16, 1941) is an American politician who served in the Connecticut House of Representatives from the 60th district from 1999 to 2017.

References

1941 births
Living people
Democratic Party members of the Connecticut House of Representatives
Politicians from Springfield, Massachusetts
People from Windsor Locks, Connecticut